Brigitte Mral (born 1953 in Germany) is a professor of rhetoric at Örebro University.  She graduated in 1978 from University of Göttingen with a master's degree, and received a Ph.D. from Uppsala University in 1986. She was active as university lecturer at Örebro University from 1987–2000, as professor of media and communication studies 2000–2002, and as professor of rhetoric from 2002.

Works

Talande kvinnor (English translation of title: "Women Speakers")
Heder och påverkan (English translation of title: "Honour and Influence")
Reklam & retorik (English translation of title: "Advertising and Rhetoric")
Women's rhetoric

References

Linguists from Germany
Rhetoric theorists
Academic staff of Örebro University
University of Göttingen alumni
Uppsala University alumni
1953 births
Living people
German women academics